Store Heddinge is a Danish town in Region Sjælland. It is the administrative seat of Stevns Municipality, and has a population of 3,668 (1 January 2022).

Geography
The town is situated in the eastern side of Denmark, on the Stevns Peninsula.

History
The town came into existence during the 13th century, and Saint Katharina Church (Sct. Katharina kirke) is also from that time.  The town received privileged status as a merchant town in 1441.  A Latin preparatory school was founded in the town in 1620, but was closed down in 1739.

The assembly house (Danish, tinghuset) in Store Heddinge was built around 1838 on the newly built Nytorv plaza as a combination town hall, assembly hall, and jail.  It was built by architect Jørgen Hansen Koch, who was Director for the Royal Danish Academy of Art (Det Kongelige Danske Kunstakademi).

The water tower is from 1912 and is made of limestone, from nearby Stevns Klint, and red brick.

Photogallery

Notable people 

 Carl Otto Reventlow (1817 in Store Heddinge - 1873) notable as the developer of a mnemonic system
 Jutta Bojsen-Møller (1837 in Store Heddinge – 1927) a high school proponent, a women's rights activist
 Jan B. Poulsen (born 1946 in Store Heddinge) a Danish football manager, 155 games with Boldklubben Frem
 Søren Ulrik Thomsen (born 1956) a Danish poet, went to school and brought up in Store Heddinge
 Jens Fink-Jensen (born 1956) a Danish poet, author, photographer, composer and architect, went to school and brought up in Store Heddinge

References

External links

Website of Stevns Municipality

Stevns Municipality
Municipal seats of Region Zealand
Municipal seats of Denmark
Cities and towns in Region Zealand